Rob Burgess (born 1957) is a Canadian executive in the technology industry. He was the chief executive officer of Macromedia Inc. from 1996 to 2005 and chairman from 1997 to 2005. Prior to that, he was CEO of Alias Research from 1991 to 1995.

Career 
From 1984 to 1991, Burgess worked in key executive posts at Silicon Graphics (SGI), a startup in the then emerging field of 3D computer graphics.  He started as a sales engineer, opened up Silicon Graphics Canada Inc., and ran that division until 1990 when he became vice president of applications and moved to Silicon Valley. In 1991, Burgess returned to Toronto to become CEO of Alias Research Inc., a young publicly traded 3D software company. Under his guidance the Alias team orchestrated a financial turnaround and became the leader in high end 3D software, and went on to develop Maya which emerged as the standard in computer animation software. On March 1, 2003, Alias was given an Academy Award for Technical Achievement by the Academy of Motion Picture Arts and Sciences for their development of Maya software.

In 1995, Alias was purchased by Silicon Graphics for $460M, and Wavefront Technologies for $180M. Burgess integrated Alias and Wavefront with Silicon Graphics and became President of the newly named Alias/Wavefront.

Burgess became the CEO of Macromedia in 1996 and held this position until 2005. He also served as board chairman from 1997 to 2005, a position he held when the company was acquired by Adobe Systems in a transaction which closed on December 5, 2005 for $4 billion, which was the fifth largest software acquisition at the time. Burgess joined the Adobe board at that time and served until 2019.

Under Burgess' tenure, he led Macromedia’s transformation from a CD-ROM based multimedia company to become the market leader in computer animation and multimedia authoring for the internet. While he was chairman and CEO, the vector animation product Flash became the worldwide standard for multimedia authoring and playback and was available on 98% of web browsers worldwide.

Current Status 
Rob Burgess currently sits on the board of directors of NVIDIA (NVDA), which he joined in 2011.

Early life and education 
Burgess grew up in Toronto, Canada and graduated from McMaster University with a Bachelor of Commerce degree in 1979. He was awarded the Wayne Fox distinguished alumni award from the DeGroote school of business in 2001, and in 2017 he received an honorary doctorate of laws.

References 

Living people
McMaster University alumni
American technology chief executives
Silicon Graphics people
Businesspeople in computing
1957 births